This article provides details of international football games played by the Israel national football team from 1934 to 1959.

Results

1934

1938

1940

1948

1949

1950

1953

1954

1956

1957

1958

1959

See also
Israel national football team results (2020–present)
Israel national football team results (1990–2019)
Israel national football team results (1960–1989)

References

External links

Football in Israel
1934
1940s in Israeli sport
1950s in Israeli sport
1930s in Mandatory Palestine